Arthur Martin may refer to:

 Arthur S. Martin (died 1996), British intelligence officer and spy scandal investigator
 Arthur N. Martin (1889–1961), Canadian painter
 Arthur Patchett Martin (1851–1902), Australian writer
 Arthur Martin (cricketer) (1888–1958), English cricketer
 Arthur Anderson Martin (1876–1916), New Zealand surgeon
 Arthur T. Martin (1903–1946), dean of the Ohio State University Moritz College of Law

See also
Arthur Martin-Leake (1874–1953), English double recipient of the Victoria Cross